is the bus public transit system in the city of Aomori in northern Japan.

References

External links
 Aomori City Bus website

Bus companies of Japan
Transport in Aomori Prefecture